Vijaya Lakshmi Pandit (née Swarup Nehru; 18 August 1900 – 1 December 1990) was an Indian freedom fighter, diplomat and politician. She served as the 8th President of the United Nations General Assembly from 1953 to 1954, the first woman appointed to either post. She was also the 6th Governor of Maharashtra from 1962 to 1964. Noted for her participation in the Indian independence movement, she was jailed several times during the movement.

Hailing from the prominent Nehru-Gandhi political family, her brother Jawaharlal Nehru was the first Prime Minister of independent India, her niece Indira Gandhi was the first female Prime Minister of India and her grand-nephew Rajiv Gandhi was the sixth and youngest Prime Minister of India. She was sent to London as India's most important diplomat after serving as India's envoy to the Soviet Union, the United States and the United Nations. Her time in London offers insights into the wider context of changes in India–UK relations.

Early life
Vijaya Lakshmi's (born Swarup) father, Motilal Nehru (1861–1931), a wealthy barrister who belonged to the Kashmiri Pandit community, served twice as President of the Indian National Congress during the Independence Struggle. Her mother, Swaruprani Thussu (1868–1938), who came from a well-known Kashmiri Pandit family settled in Lahore, was Motilal's second wife, the first having died in child birth. She was the second of three children; Jawaharlal was eleven years her senior (b. 1889), while her younger sister Krishna Hutheesing (b. 1907-1967) became a noted writer and authored several books on their brother.

Career 

She attended the 1916 Congress session that took place in Lucknow. She was impressed by Sarojini Naidu and Annie Besant.

In 1920, she spent time in Mahatma Gandhi's ashram close to Ahmedabad. She participated in daily chores including dairy work and spinning. She also worked in the office that used to publish Young India.

Pandit was the first Indian woman to hold a cabinet post in pre-independent India. In 1936, she stood in general elections and became member of parliament by 1937 for constituency of Cawnpore Bilhaur. In 1937, she was elected to the provincial legislature of the United Provinces and was designated minister of local self-government and public health. She held the latter post until 1938 and again from 1946 to 1947. 

She spent significant time in jail for her participation in the Indian independence movement. She was jailed for 18 months from 1931 - 1933. She was jailed again for 6 months in 1940 before getting jailed in 1942 for 7 months over her participation in the Quit India Movement. After her release, she helped the victims of the Bengal famine of 1943 and served as president of the Save the Children Fund Committee which rescued poor children from the streets.

Following the death of her husband in 1944, she experienced Indian inheritance laws for Hindu widows and campaigned with All India Women's Conference to bring changes to these laws.

In 1946, she was elected to the Constituent Assembly from the United Provinces.

Following India's freedom from British occupation in 1947 she entered the diplomatic service and became India's ambassador to the Soviet Union from 1947 to 1949, the United States and Mexico from 1949 to 1951, Ireland from 1955 to 1961 (during which time she was also the Indian High Commissioner to the United Kingdom), and Spain from 1956 to 1961. Between 1946 and 1968, she headed the Indian delegation to the United Nations. In 1953, she became the first woman President of the United Nations General Assembly (she was inducted as an honorary member of the Alpha Kappa Alpha sorority in 1978 for this accomplishment).

Hon.  Members that Shrimati Vijaya  Lakshmi Pandit  has  resigned her seat in the House with effect from 17 December 1954.

In India, she served as Governor of Maharashtra from 1962 to 1964. She returned as a member of parliament for 1964 to 1968 with her election victory in Phulpur. Pandit was a harsh critic of Indira Gandhi's years as Prime Minister especially after Indira had declared the emergency in 1975.

Pandit retired from active politics after relations between them soured. On retiring, she moved to Dehradun in the Doon Valley in the Himalayan foothills. She came out of retirement in 1977 to campaign against Indira Gandhi and helped the Janata Party win the 1977 election. She was reported to have considered running for the presidency, but Neelam Sanjiva Reddy eventually ran and won the election unopposed.

In 1979, she was appointed the Indian representative to the UN Human Rights Commission, after which she retired from public life. Her writings include The Evolution of India (1958) and The Scope of Happiness: A Personal Memoir (1979).

Personal life

In 1921, she was married to Ranjit Sitaram Pandit (1921–1944), a successful barrister from Kathiawar, Gujarat and classical scholar who translated Kalhana's epic history Rajatarangini into English from Sanskrit. Her husband  was a Maharashtrian Saraswat Brahmin, whose family hailed from village of Bambuli, on the Ratnagiri coast, in Maharashtra. He was arrested for his support of Indian independence and died in Lucknow prison in 1944, leaving behind his wife and their three daughters Chandralekha Mehta, Nayantara Sehgal and Rita Dar.

She died in the year of 1990. She was survived by her daughters, Chandralekha and Nayantara Sahgal.

Academics 

She was the member of Aligarh Muslim University Executive Council. 

She was an Honorary Fellow of Somerville College, Oxford, where her niece studied Modern History. A portrait of her by Edward Halliday hangs in the Somerville College Library.

See also
 List of political families
 History of Indian foreign relations

References

Further reading
 Ankit, Rakesh. "Between Vanity and Sensitiveness: Indo–British Relations During Vijayalakshmi Pandit's High-Commissionership (1954–61)". Contemporary British History 30:1 (2016): 20–39. .

External links

 

1900 births
1990 deaths
India MPs 1952–1957
20th-century Indian women politicians
20th-century Indian politicians
India MPs 1962–1967
India MPs 1967–1970
Ambassadors of India to Ireland
Ambassadors of India to Mexico
Ambassadors of India to Spain
Ambassadors of India to the Soviet Union
Ambassadors of India to the United States
Fellows of Somerville College, Oxford
Governors of Maharashtra
High Commissioners of India to the United Kingdom
Indian Hindus
Kashmiri people
Lok Sabha members from Uttar Pradesh
Nehru–Gandhi family
People from Allahabad district
Permanent Representatives of India to the United Nations
Politicians from Allahabad
Politicians from Dehradun
Politicians from Lucknow
Presidents of the United Nations General Assembly
Prisoners and detainees of British India
Recipients of the Padma Vibhushan in civil service
Women in Maharashtra politics
Women in Uttar Pradesh politics
Women members of the Lok Sabha
Women state cabinet ministers of India
Women state governors of India
Indian women ambassadors